A list of animated feature films first released in 1998.

Highest-grossing animated films of the year

See also
 List of animated television series of 1998

References

 Feature films
1998
1998-related lists